Shirley Reilly (born May 29, 1985) is an American wheelchair racer who competes in track races and the marathon distance in the T53/T54 categories. She has represented the United States at the Summer Paralympics in 2004, 2008 and 2012. She was the winner of the 2012 Boston Marathon race.

Early life
Reilly was born in Anchorage, Alaska. She was paralyzed from the waist down at birth as she was delivered six weeks premature. Her early life was marked by frequent operations, including surgery around 1997 when she had eight spinal discs and two ribs removed.

Career
She moved to California and graduated from a school in Los Gatos in 2003. Reilly took part in competitive sports at high school and focused on track athletics. She competed in the 2002 IWAS World Games and achieved her aim of participating in the Summer Paralympics at the 2004 Athens Games.

Reilly began to move towards road events thereafter, particularly the marathon. She was runner-up in the wheelchair section of the Los Angeles Marathon in 2005 and returned to following year to win the race. She became a regular performer at the Boston Marathon, coming fourth in 2005, improving to third in 2006, then taking fifth in 2007. She came fourth in the wheelchair race at the Peachtree 10K in 2008. In her second Paralympic appearance, she competed in the 1500 metres, 5000 metres and the marathon (finishing seventh in the latter event). The following year she was runner-up at the Gasparilla Distance Classic, and third at both the 2009 Boston Marathon and Grandma's Marathon. She debuted in the New York City Marathon in November and took seventh place.

She came in fourth at the 2010 Boston Marathon with a time of 1:57:23 hours and set a personal best of 1:41:01 hours at the 2011 race, finishing as runner-up behind Wakako Tsuchida. Reilly represented her country at the 2011 IPC Athletics World Championships. She defeated Tsuchida at the 2012 Boston Marathon, beating her at the line by a margin of one second to win the Boston Marathon title and set a best of 1:37:36 hours. Later that month she took part in the London Marathon for the first time and came in fourth after Canada's Diane Roy.

Personal life
Reilly is of Iñupiat heritage.

References

External links
 Interview before London Marathon in 2012

1985 births
American female wheelchair racers
Athletes (track and field) at the 2004 Summer Paralympics
Athletes (track and field) at the 2008 Summer Paralympics
Athletes (track and field) at the 2012 Summer Paralympics
Inupiat people
Living people
Medalists at the 2012 Summer Paralympics
Medalists at the 2015 Parapan American Games
Native American sportspeople
Olympic wheelchair racers of the United States
Paralympic bronze medalists for the United States
Paralympic gold medalists for the United States
Paralympic silver medalists for the United States
Paralympic wheelchair racers
People from North Slope Borough, Alaska
People with paraplegia
Sportspeople from Anchorage, Alaska
Track and field athletes from Alaska
Paralympic medalists in athletics (track and field)
Paralympic track and field athletes of the United States
University of Arizona alumni
21st-century American women
21st-century Native American women
21st-century Native Americans